Cercospora corylina is a fungal plant pathogen.

References

corylina
Fungal plant pathogens and diseases